The Mankiewicz family is an American family of German-Jewish descent, with members including:

 Herman J. Mankiewicz (1897–1953), Hollywood screenwriter (1 Oscar) (brother of Joseph)
 Don Mankiewicz (1922–2015), screenwriter (son of Herman)
 John Mankiewicz (born 1954), screenwriter and producer (son of Don) 
 Jane Mankiewicz, fiction writer published in The New Yorker (daughter of Don) 
 Frank Mankiewicz (1924–2014), journalist, publicist, politician (son of Herman)
 Josh Mankiewicz (born 1955), television journalist (son of Frank, brother of Ben)
 Ben Mankiewicz (born 1967), co-host of The Young Turks, currently the primary host on Turner Classic Movies (TCM) (son of Frank, brother of Josh)
 Johanna Mankiewicz Davis (1937–1974), novelist (daughter of Herman)
 Nick Davis (born 1965), screenwriter, director and producer (son of Johanna) 
 Tim Davis (born 1963), television writer (son of Johanna) 
 Joseph L. Mankiewicz (1909–1993), Hollywood screenwriter (2 Oscars), director (2 Oscars) and producer (brother of Herman)
 Christopher Mankiewicz (born 1940), actor and producer (son of Joseph) 
 Tom Mankiewicz (1942–2010), screenwriter, director and producer (son of Joseph)
 Alex Mankiewicz (born 1966), illustrator and artist (daughter of Joseph)
 Francis Mankiewicz (1944–1993), Canadian filmmaker, second cousin once removed to Herman J. Mankiewicz and Joseph L. Mankiewicz

 

 
American people of German-Jewish descent
Jewish-American families